Yuriy Gorlis-Gorsky (real name Yuriy Horodyanin-Lisovsky; alias Gorlis-Gorsky, in the underground Zaliznyak, Gorsky, Horlitsa; January 14, 1898, Demidovka — September 27, 1946, Augsburg) was a Ukrainian writer, public figure and Ukrainian People's Army officer.

Biography 
He was born in Demidovka in Poltava region. Father — Yuri Lisovsky, officer of the Russian Imperial Army (RIA), mother — Ludwika Sokolowska came from a Polish noble family. According to another version, the year of birth - 1902, the place - Tarnoruda in Podillya, now Volochysk district.

He participated in the First World War. In the years of the National Revolution, he was a colonel of the Bogdanovsky Regiment of the Zaporozhye Division, which he joined at the age of 20.

The interwar period 
At the beginning of February 1920, during the Winter Campaign, when the Zaporizhzhia Division was in the vicinity of the Cold Yar, Yuri became ill and remained in treatment at the Motronin Monastery, where the headquarters of the Cold Yar Haydamak regiment was stationed. He had to catch up with his military unit after treatment, but the Kholodny Yar Republic partisans, who lacked soldiers with military experience, convinced him to stay with them.

He chose the nickname Zaliznyak, and accepted the assignment of 1st Lieutenant of the hundred of the Hajdamak regiment, becoming one of the closest assistants of the Ataman Petrenko and Chief Ataman Vasyl Chuchupak.

After becoming a liaison to the Ukrainian People's Republic government, in the spring of 1922 he returned to Bolshevik-occupied Ukraine. He carried out underground work - under the pseudonym "Gorsky" — first in Kyiv and then in Podillya. But soon Yuri was arrested. He had to spend 8 months in the Vinnytsia GPU prison. The Chekists failed to prove his guilt and on December 16, 1923, he was released from custody.

On the instructions of the Ukrainian government, Gorsky agreed to work in the NKVD intelligence apparatus. According to a later statement by one of the most experienced leaders of the Podolsk GPU, Halytsky, Gorsky failed many Chekist operations. In 1924 he was arrested again. The Bolsheviks "appreciated" Yuri's anti-communist underground work in Podillya by 15 years in prison.

He was kept in a prison hospital for several years. During this time he was in prisons in Vinnytsia, Kyiv, Poltava and Kherson. Later he was transferred to the Kherson Psychiatric Hospital, from where he escaped in April 1931. In April 1932, after a long journey through the Soviet Union, he crossed the border and found himself in Rivne.

Later he lived in Lviv, Bagatkivtsi and Plow. Living in Bagatkivtsi with the local priest Fr. Vasyl Izhak, he visited the local reading room, where he told about the life of Ukrainians in Zbruch.

In October 1932, the publishing house "Chronicle of the Red Viburnum" published an article by Gorlis-Gorsky "Cold Yar", and the next day began publishing a magazine version of his most important work — "Cold Yar". The first book published in 1933 was Ave dictator! In 1934 the novel "Ataman Cloud" was published.In 1935 the book "In the Enemy Camp" and a reprint of the first part of "Cold Yar" (reprinted in 1961 in New York) were published in Lviv.

Later, the second part of the novel "In the Enemy Camp" was written, which was called "Between the Living Corpses" (about being in a psychiatric hospital). The manuscript was lost during the fighting in Transcarpathia. Yuri Gorlis-Gorsky was saddened by the loss, as he considered this novel his best work.

In the autumn of 1935 he published memoirs, The Red Thistle (The Red Army in the Light of Reality): Based on Materials Announced in the Soviets and Abroad, and from His Own Observations during Life in the USSR, also about the events of 1931-1932. 1936 in the publishing house "Victoria" publishes the play "We swear by the graves of heroes! (Ataman Cloud)».

The second part of "Cold Yar" was published in 1937 in publishing house "Cheap Book". The book had a huge success in Galicia, especially among young people.

During the preparation of the publication "Cold Yar" in Galicia, the text was adapted to the needs of the local reader. Thus, numerous words and expressions appeared in the novel, peculiar only to Galicia. Modern reprints are mainly based on the London edition of Nikita Myronenko in 1967.

Transcarpathian period

in Transcarpathia Yuri Gorlis-Gorsky together with former soldiers of the Army of the Ukrainian People's Republic defended Carpathian Ukraine.

After the defeat of Carpathian Ukraine, Yuri taught for a while in a remote Transcarpathian town, then moved to Romania and then to Yugoslavia. Here he was called to Canada: the Ukrainians of Saskatchewan invited the famous writer to settle in this country.

But information about a possible German war against the Soviet Union forced him to change his plans: Yuri Gorlis-Gorsky rightly saw this future war as a chance for Ukraine to become an independent state, so he could not move to another country.

Second World War

At the end of 1939, Gorlis-Gorsky went to Finland, where he tried to create a unit from Ukrainians captured during the Soviet-Finnish war.

In June 1942, Gorlis-Gorsky realized his dream — he returned to the Kholodny Yar. The writer settles in Oleksandrivka and collects testimonies of participants in the struggle in the Kholodny Yar. In Melniki, Gorlis-Gorsky visited the parents of Peter and Vasyl Chuchupaky and presented them with his book about the Kholodny Yar.

With the arrival of the Red Army in Ukraine, he began moving to the West. In Lviv, on November 26, 1943, in the Orthodox Church of St. George, he married Halyna Talashchuk.

Through Austria, Yuri Gorlis-Gorsky and his wife moved to Germany and settled in a camp for displaced persons ("DP") in New Ulm, where on September 25, 1946 his daughter Lesya was born.

In New Ulm, Yuri began active political activity. Along with Ivan Bahrianyi, Borys Levitsky, Roman Paladiychuk and others, he founded the Ukrainian Revolutionary Democratic Party (URDP).

Yuriy Gorlis-Gorsky mysteriously disappeared on September 27, 1946.

Literary works 
Author of prose works "Otaman Khmara" (1934), "Red Thistle" (1935), "Cold Yar" (1937), "Ave Dictator" (1941), memoirs "Among the living corpses", which are considered lost.

References

External links 

 Biography of Yuri Gorodyanin-Lisovsky..
 Biography of Yuri Gorodyanin-Lisovsky.
 Лунін Сергій. «Холодний Яр» Юрія Горліс-Горського: Археографічний аналіз.
 The book "Kholodny Yar"..
 Report on visits to Kholodny Yar and celebration of the anniversary of the Kholodny Yar Republic..
 Yuriy Horlis-Gorsky and Ukrainian volunteers in the Winter War

People from Ternopil Oblast
People from Neu-Ulm
People from Lviv Oblast
People of the Winter War
Ukrainian resistance members
Russian military personnel of World War I
1946 deaths
Ukrainian writers
1898 births